Patrick Branwell Brontë (commonly ; 26 June 1817 – 24 September 1848) was an English painter and writer. He was the only son of the Brontë family, and brother of the writers Charlotte, Emily, and Anne. Brontë was rigorously tutored at home by his father, and earned praise for his poetry and translations from the classics. However, he drifted between jobs, supporting himself by portrait-painting, and gave way to drug and alcohol addiction, apparently worsened by a failed relationship with a married woman. Brontë died at the age of 31.

Youth

Branwell Brontë was the fourth of six children and the only son of Patrick Brontë (1777–1861) and his wife, Maria Branwell Brontë (1783–1821). He was born in Thornton, near Bradford, West Riding of Yorkshire, and moved with his family to Haworth when his father was appointed to the perpetual curacy in 1821.

While four of his five sisters were sent to Cowan Bridge boarding school, Branwell was educated at home by his father, who gave him a classical education. Elizabeth Gaskell, biographer of his sister, Charlotte Brontë, says of Branwell's schooling "Mr. Brontë's friends advised him to send his son to school; but, remembering both the strength of will of his own youth and his mode of employing it, he believed that Branwell was better at home, and that he himself could teach him well, as he had told others before." His two eldest sisters died just before his eighth birthday in 1825, and their loss affected him deeply.

Even as a young boy Brontë read extensively, and was especially fond of the "Noctes Ambrosianae", literary dialogues published in Blackwood's Magazine. He took leadership role with Charlotte in a series of fantasy role-playing games which the siblings wrote and performed about the "Young Men", characters based on a set of wooden soldiers. The plays evolved into an intricate saga based in West Africa about the fictitious Glass Town confederacy. From 1834, he both collaborated and competed with his sister Charlotte to describe another imaginary world, Angria. Branwell's particular interest in these paracosms were their politics and wars, including the destructive rivalry between their heroes, Charlotte's Arthur Wellesley, Duke of Zamorna, and his Alexander Percy, Earl of Northangerland. These writings impress by their virtuosity and scope, but are also repetitive when compared to Charlotte's contributions. Christine Alexander, a Brontë juvenilia historian the University of New South Wales, wrote "Both Charlotte and Branwell ensured the consistency of their imaginary world. When Branwell exuberantly kills off important characters in his manuscripts, Charlotte comes to the rescue and, in effect, resurrects them for the next stories [...]; and when Branwell becomes bored with his inventions, such as the Glass Town magazine he edits, Charlotte takes over his initiative and keeps the publication going for several more years. It was Branwell, however, who took a pride in systematizing their private world and maintaining a consistent political structure, features typical of paracosmic play. He documented in encyclopaedic detail, in neat lists, footnotes, sketches and maps, the geography, history, government, and social structure of the Glass Town Federation (and later, the new kingdom of Angria)—laying down the parameters of the imaginary world". He often wrote under several pseudonyms, such as Captain John Bud, Sergeant Bud, and Chief Genius Bany, who were also characters in their world.

Surrounded by female company and missing that of males, there are signs of pleasure in his early works of the wider options he would have due to his sex.
Aged 11 in January 1829 he began producing a magazine, later named Branwell's Blackwood's Magazine which included his poems, plays, criticisms, histories and dialogues.
Unlike his sisters, Brontë was not prepared for a specific career. In his only real attempt to find work, on the death of James Hogg, a Blackwood's writer, the 18-year-old Brontë boldly wrote to the magazine suggesting himself as a replacement. Between 1835 and 1842, Brontë wrote a total of six times to the magazine, sending poems and arrogantly offering his services. His letters were left unanswered. He began enjoying masculine company in the pubs in Haworth, and in February 1836 joined Haworth's Masonic Lodge of the Three Graces at the youngest possible age.

In 1829–30, Patrick Brontë engaged John Bradley, an artist from neighbouring Keighley, as drawing-master for the children. Bradley was an artist of some local repute, rather than a professional instructor, but he may well have fostered Branwell's enthusiasm for art and architecture. Bradley emigrated to America in 1831, and Branwell Brontë continued his studies under the portrait painter William Robinson. In 1834, he painted a portrait of his three sisters. He included his own image but became dissatisfied with it and painted it out. This portrait is now one of the best known images of the sisters and hangs in the National Portrait Gallery.

In 1835, he wrote a letter to the Royal Academy of Arts seeking to be admitted. Earlier biographers reported a move to London to study painting, which quickly ended following Brontë's dissolute spending on drink. Other biographers speculated that he was too intimidated to present himself at the Academy. More recent scholarship suggests that Brontë did not send the letter or even make the trip to London. According to Francis Leyland, Brontë's friend and a future biographer of the family, his first job was as an usher at a Halifax school. More certainly, Brontë worked as a portrait painter in Bradford in 1838 and 1839. Though certain of his paintings, for example that of his landlady Mrs. Kirby and a portrait of Emily show talent for comedic and serious styles, other portraits lack life. He returned to Haworth in debt in 1839.

Adulthood

With his father, Brontë reviewed the classics with a view to future employment as a tutor. At the beginning of January 1840, he started his employment with the family of Robert Postlethwaite in Broughton-in-Furness. During this time he wrote letters to his pub friends in Haworth which give "a vivid picture of Branwell's scabrous humour, his boastfulness, and his need to be accepted in a man's world". According to Brontë, he started his job off with a riotous drinking session in Kendal.

During this employment he continued his literary work, including sending poems and translations to Thomas De Quincey and Hartley Coleridge who both lived in the Lake District. At Coleridge's invitation, he visited the poet at his cottage who encouraged him to pursue his translations of Horace's Odes. In June 1840 he sent the translations to Coleridge, despite having been dismissed by the Postlethwaites. According to Juliet Barker's biography of the Brontës, he may have fathered an illegitimate child during time in the town, but others suspect that it may be more of Brontë's boasting. Coleridge began an encouraging letter about the quality of the translations in November–December 1840 but never finished it.
In October 1840, Brontë moved near to Halifax, where he had many good friends including the sculptor Joseph Bentley Leyland and Francis Grundy. He obtained employment with the Manchester and Leeds Railway, initially as 'assistant clerk in charge' at Sowerby Bridge railway station, where he was paid £75 per annum (paid quarterly).
Later, on 1 April 1841, he was promoted to  'clerk in charge' at Luddendenfoot railway station in West Yorkshire, where his salary increased to £130. In 1842 he was dismissed due to a deficit in the accounts of £11–1s–7d (£11.19) This had probably been stolen by Watson, the porter, who was left in charge when Brontë went drinking. This was attributed to incompetence rather than theft and the missing sum was deducted from his salary.
A description by Francis Leyland of Brontë at this time described him as "rather below middle height, but of a refined and gentleman-like appearance, and of graceful manners. His complexion was fair and his features handsome; his mouth and chin were well-shaped; his nose was prominent and of the Roman type; his eyes sparkled and danced with delight, and his forehead made up of a face of oval form which gave an irresistible charm to its possessor, and attracted the admiration of those who knew him." Another described him less flatteringly as "almost insignificantly small" and with "a mass of red hair which he wore brushed off his forehead – to help his height I fancy... small ferrety eyes, deep sunk and still further hidden by the never removed spectacles."

In January 1843, after nine months at Haworth, Brontë took up another tutoring position in Thorp Green, where he was to tutor the Reverend Edmund Robinson's young son. His sister Anne had been the governess there since May 1840. As usual, at first things went well, with Charlotte reporting in January 1843 that her siblings were "both wonderously valued in their situations." During his 30 months service Branwell corresponded with several old friends about his increasing infatuation with Robinson's wife Lydia, née Gisborne, a charming and sophisticated woman, almost fifteen years senior to him. He wrote, perhaps unreliably, to one of his friends that "my mistress is DAMNABLY TOO FOND OF ME" and sent him a "lock of her hair, wch has lain at night on his breast – wd to God it could do so legally !" In July 1845, he was dismissed from his position. According to Gaskell, he received a letter "sternly dismissing him, intimating that his proceedings were discovered, characterising them as bad beyond expression and charging him, on pain of exposure, to break off immediately, and for ever, all communication with every member of the family." Multiple explanations have been given for this, including inappropriate relationships with a Robinson daughter or son, or that he had passed forged cheques. The most likely explanation is Brontë's own account that he had an affair with Mrs Robinson which Brontë hoped would lead to marriage after her husband's death. For several months after his dismissal, he regularly received small amounts of money from Thorpe Green, sent by Mrs. Robinson herself, probably to dissuade him from blackmailing his former employer and lover.

Brontë returned home to his family at the Haworth parsonage, where he looked for another job, wrote poetry and attempted to adapt Angrian material into a book called And the Weary are at Rest. During the 1840s, several of his poems were published in local newspapers under the name of Northangerland, making him the first of the Brontës to be a published poet. Soon however, after Mr Robinson's death, Mrs Robinson made clear that she was not going to marry Branwell, who then "declined into chronic alcoholism, opiates and debt". Charlotte's letters from this time demonstrate that she was angered by his behaviour. In January 1847, he wrote to his friend Leyland about the easy existence he hoped for: "to try and make myself a name in the world of posterity, without being pestered by the small but countless botherments." His behaviour became increasingly impossible and embarrassing to the family. He managed to set fire to his bed, after which his father had to sleep with him for the safety of the family. Towards the end of his life he was sending notes to a friend asking of "Five pence (5d) worth of Gin".  Charlotte Brontë wrote to her publisher that Branwell died without "ever knowing that his sisters had published a line." However, according to Juliet Barker's biography, Branwell may have known about his sisters' publication of their poetry, having been the accidental recipient of some proofs since their pseudonyms were thought to be male. Barker also states that Branwell's friends said he claimed authorship of Wuthering Heights (though they may have said this out of loyalty).

Death

On 24 September 1848, Brontë died at Haworth parsonage, most likely due to tuberculosis aggravated by delirium tremens, alcoholism, and laudanum and opium addiction, despite the fact that his death certificate notes "chronic bronchitis-marasmus" as the cause. Elizabeth Gaskell's biography of Charlotte reports an eye-witness account that Brontë, wanting to show the power of the human will, decided to die standing up, "and when the last agony began, he insisted on assuming the position just mentioned." On 28 September 1848, he was interred in the family vault.

Emily Brontë died of tuberculosis on 19 December of that year and Anne Brontë on 29 May 1849 in the coastal resort of Scarborough. Charlotte, the last living sister, married the Reverend Arthur Bell Nichols, curate of Haworth, in 1854 and died in March 1855, due to complications from pregnancy.

Cultural references

Polly Teale wrote a 2005 play entitled Brontë about the three sisters, in which Branwell was portrayed as a drunk and jealous brother due to the growing successes of his sisters.

Blake Morrison wrote the play We are Three Sisters (2011), a re-working of Chekhov's Three Sisters based on the lives of the Brontë sisters and featuring Branwell and Mrs Robinson, which premiered in Halifax on 9 September before touring.

British novelist Robert Edric wrote Sanctuary (2014), a novel chronicling Branwell's final months, during which family secrets are revealed and he learns about the publication of his sisters' books.

Portrayals
In the 1946 film Devotion, he was portrayed by Arthur Kennedy.

In the film The Brontë Sisters (Les Sœurs Brontë, 1979) he was portrayed by Pascal Greggory.

He was portrayed by Adam Nagaitis in To Walk Invisible (2016), a BBC drama about the Brontë family.

In the film Emily (2022) he was portrayed by Fionn Whitehead.

Works

Poems
"Lines Spoken by a Lawyer on the Occasion of the Transfer of This Magazine"
"On Caroline"
"Thorp Green"
"Remember Me"
"Sir Henry Tunstall"
"Penmaenmawr"
"Real Rest"
"Letter from a Father on Earth to His Child in Her Grave"
"The End of All"

Juvenilia
(written with his sisters)
Battell Book
The Glass Town
The Young Men's Magazine, Number 1 – 3 (August 1830)
The Revenge A Tradgedy
The History of the Young Men from Their First Settlement to the Present Time (1829–1831)
The Fate of Regina
The Liar Detected 
Ode on the Celebration of the Great African Games
The Pirate A Tale
Real Life in Verdopolis, volume 1–2
The Politics of Verdopolis
An Angrain Battle Song
Percy's Musings upon the Battle of Edwardston
Mary's Prayer
An Historical Narrative of the War of Encroachment 
An Historical Narrative of the War of Agression
Angria and the Angrians
Letters from an Englishman (1830–1832)
Life of Warner Howard Warner
Tales of Angria (written 1838–1839 – a collection of childhood and young adult writings including five short novels)

References

Further reading
Branwell Brontë: a biography by Winifred Gérin (Toronto/NY: T. Nelson & Sons, 1961, Hutchinson 1972)
The Infernal World of Branwell Brontë by Daphne du Maurier (Victor Gollancz 1960, Penguin Books 1972)
The Poems of Patrick Branwell Brontë, ed. by Tom Winnifrith (Oxford: Blackwell Ltd, 1983)
The Life of Patrick Branwell Brontë by Tom Winnifrith
The Brontës and their Background by Tom Winnifrith (1973 Macmillan, 1988 Palgrave Macmillan)
The Brontës by Juliet Barker (London, Weidenfeld and Nicolson, 1994)
A Brontë Family Chronology by Edward Chitham (2003 Palgrave Macmillan)
Branwell, A Novel of the Brontë Brother, by Douglas A. Martin
 A Chainless Soul, a biography of Emily Brontë, by Katherine Frank
Sanctuary, a novel based on Branwell Brontë's final months, by Robert Edric (2014 Doubleday)
Oblivion: The Lost Diaries of Branwell Brontë, by Dean de la Motte (2022 Valley Press)

External links

 
 Brontë Society and Parsonage Museum in Haworth
 Brontë Italian Site
 Patrick Brontë papers, circa 1830s-1990s, held by the Henry W. and Albert A. Berg Collection of English and American Literature, New York Public Library.

1817 births
1848 deaths
19th-century deaths from tuberculosis
19th-century English poets
19th-century English painters
English male painters
English people of Cornish descent
English people of Irish descent
English portrait painters
Brontë family
People from Thornton and Allerton
Tuberculosis deaths in England